This is a list of episodes of the Chinese variety show Running Man in season 4. The show airs on ZRTG: Zhejiang Television.

Episodes

References

External links
Running Man China Official Homepage

2016 Chinese television seasons